Ayyoub Allach (born 28 January 1998) is a professional footballer who plays as a midfielder for Gabala. Born in Belgium, he is of Moroccan descent.

Career
On 6 February 2023, Gabala announced the signing of Allach to an 18-month contract.

Career statistics

Club

Notes

References

1998 births
Belgian sportspeople of Moroccan descent
Living people
Moroccan footballers
Morocco under-20 international footballers
Belgian footballers
Association football midfielders
Lierse S.K. players
Sporting Kansas City II players
Lierse Kempenzonen players
R.E. Virton players
Gabala FC players
Challenger Pro League players
Belgian Pro League players
Belgian Third Division players
USL Championship players
Moroccan expatriate footballers
Belgian expatriate footballers
Expatriate soccer players in the United States
Moroccan expatriate sportspeople in the United States
Belgian expatriate sportspeople in the United States
Expatriate footballers in Azerbaijan
Moroccan expatriate sportspeople in Azerbaijan
Belgian expatriate sportspeople in Azerbaijan